Pyotr Grigoryevich Demidov (Russian: Пётр Григорьевич Демидов; 5 November 1807 – 14 April 1862) was a Russian nobleman and general. Most notably he was involved in the Hungarian campaign of 1849.

Life 
He was the second child of Grigory Alexandrovich Demidov and his wife Ekaterina Petrovna Lopuchina, daughter of Pyotr Lopukhin and sister of Anna Lopukhina. He joined the army in 1825 as a non-commissioned officer in a cavalry regiment. On 14 July that year he was promoted to cornet and for his part in suppressing the November Uprising to lieutenant. On 1 July 1833 he was made an adjutant and two years later a lieutenant-colonel. In 1842 he became a full colonel. On 3 April 1849 he became major general and on 8 September 1855 adjutant general – at the latter rank he accompanied Alexander II of Russia to Moscow for his coronation. He died of tuberculosis on 14 April 1862.

Marriage and issue 
On 12 July 1835 he married Elizaveta Hikolaevna Bezobrazova (1813–22 May 1876), by whom he had three children:
 Nikolai Petrovich (1836–1910);
 Ekaterina Petrovna (1838–?), married prince Nikolaj Sergeevič Kudašev;
 Grigory Petrovich (29 November 1840–1851/1852).

Sources 

 La Grande Enciclopedia russa, 2007 – V. 8 – pp. 496-768. 

Imperial Russian major generals
19th-century military personnel from the Russian Empire
1807 births
1862 deaths
19th-century deaths from tuberculosis
Tuberculosis deaths in Russia
Russian untitled nobility